Richard Chess may refer to:

Richard B. Chess (1913–1982), American politician
Richard Chess (poet) (born 1953), American academic and poet